Machakos University is a public university in Machakos, Kenya.

History
Machakos University was founded in 1957 as a Technical Rural Training School by the then colonial government. It was converted into Machakos Technical and Trade School in 1958, Machakos Technical School in 1967, and Machakos Technical Training Institute (MTTI) in 1987.

MTTI was acknowledged for having a strong background in Engineering and Technology, Hospitality and Tourism. The institution was upgraded to Machakos University College through Legal Notice No. 130, on 16 September 2011. The journey towards achieving a full University status started in earnest right at the inception.

Machakos University was chartered on October 7, 2016. Formerly, it was a constituent college of Kenyatta University. The University has a strong pedagogical premise for quality teaching and training in order to achieve its mandate of ensuring accessible, affordable, flexible and relevant academic programmes for the changing socio-economic and other societal needs.

The Commission for University Education has made three inspection visits to the institution and their reports have shaped the developments of the university to full-fledged status. Recently, the commission approved 27 programmes ranging from undergraduate, masters to PhD levels. At the heart of the Lower Eastern Region and only one kilometre from Machakos City along Machakos/Wote Road, the university is destined to continue its growth trajectory to world class status in the near future.

Academics

Machakos University Academic Division is composed the schools below:
School of Engineering and Technology
School of Business and Economics
School of Education
School of Pure and Applied Sciences
School of Hospitality and Tourism Management
School of Agricultural Sciences
School of Health Sciences
School of Humanities and Social Sciences
School of Environmental Sciences

References

Universities and colleges in Kenya